The Han Sang Soo Embroidery Museum is an art museum specializing in Korean embroidery located in Gahoe-dong, Jongno-gu, central of Seoul, South Korea. It was established by Han Sang Soo (born ), who holds a title as a jasujang (embroidery artisan), a profession recognized as an Important Intangible Cultural Property by the Cultural Heritage Administration of South Korea.

See also
 Chung Young Yang Embroidery Museum, also in Seoul
 Bukchon Art Museum
 Bukchon Hanok Village
 List of museums in South Korea

References
  한상수 자수박물관

External links
   
 자수장 한상수 씨의 '주머니와 보자기 전'  at The Chosun Ilbo

Art museums and galleries in Seoul
Korean embroidery
Textile museums
Art museums established in 2006
2006 establishments in South Korea